is a passenger railway station in the city of Narita, Chiba, operated by the East Japan Railway Company (JR East).

Lines
Narita Station is served by the Narita Line, and is located 13.1 kilometers from the terminus of line at Sakura Station and 68.5 kilometers from Tokyo Station.

Station layout

Narita Station has a single side platform and two island platforms, connected to the station building though footbridges to a common concourse. Track 4 is not served by a platform, and is used by non-stop Narita Express and Ayame limited express services. The station has a Midori no Madoguchi staffed ticket office.

Platforms

History

Narita Station opened on 19 January 1897 as a terminal station on the Narita Railway Company for both freight and passenger operations. The Chiba Prefectural Tako Line began operations on 1 July 1911, connecting Narita with Tako, Chiba. The Narita Railway was nationalised on 1 September 1920, becoming part of the Japanese Government Railway (JGR), and on 1 April 1927, the Chiba Prefectural Tako Line was renamed the Narita Railway Company Tako Line. This line stopped operations on 11 January 1944 due to wartime conditions, and was officially abolished in 1946. After World War II, the JGR became the Japan National Railways (JNR). The station building was reconstructed from 1977–1979. The station was absorbed into the JR East network upon the privatization of the Japanese National Railways (JNR) on 1 April 1987. The spur line to Narita Airport was completed on 19 March 1991.

Passenger statistics
In fiscal 2019, the station was used by an average of 16,103 passengers daily (boarding passengers only).

Surrounding area
 Keisei-Narita Station
 Narita City Hall
 Shimofusa Post Office

See also
 List of railway stations in Japan

References

External links

 JR East station information 

Railway stations in Japan opened in 1897
Railway stations in Narita, Chiba
Narita Line
Stations of East Japan Railway Company